Kevin Patrick Dowling, C.SS.R., (born 14 February 1944) is a South African prelate of the Roman Catholic Church. A Redemptorist, he was the second Bishop of Rustenburg from 1991 to 2020.

Biography
Born in Pretoria, Dowling was ordained a priest of the Congregation of the Most Holy Redeemer, more commonly known as the Redemptorists, on 9 July 1967.

He was appointed Bishop of Rustenburg on 2 December 1990. He received his episcopal consecration on 27 January 1991  from Archbishop Denis Hurley.

He advocated the use of condoms to prevent HIV transmission. Catholic teaching opposed the promotion of condom use. The papal nuncio to South Africa told Dowling that he had strayed from Catholic teaching. The Southern African Bishops Conference also described condoms as "an immoral and misguided weapon" in the fight against HIV, arguing that condom use could even encourage the spread of HIV by promoting extramarital sex. For his stance on this matter, the Utne Reader, a United States magazine that provides "alternative coverage of politics, culture, and new ideas", named Dowling one of its "50 Visionaries Who Are Changing the World".

Dowling also criticized the application of the Southern African Catholic Bishops Conference for approval of the revision of the English translation of the Mass liturgy as premature. He objected to the revision itself, which had received the Holy See's confirmation after being agreed on by English-speaking Episcopal Conferences: "I am concerned that this latest decision from the Vatican may be interpreted as another example of what is perceived to be a systematic and well-managed dismantling of the vision, theology and ecclesiology of Vatican II." He wrote:

Pope Francis accepted his resignation on 25 November 2020.

References

External links

 

Living people
1944 births
20th-century Roman Catholic bishops in South Africa
21st-century Roman Catholic bishops in South Africa
South African people of Irish descent
Dowling, Kevin
People from Pretoria
Redemptorist bishops
Roman Catholic bishops of Rustenburg